Alex Kapp (born Alexandra Deering Kapp; formerly Alex Kapp Horner; December 5, 1969) is an American television actress and writer, best recognized for her role as Lindsay on the CBS sitcom The New Adventures of Old Christine (2006–10).

Career
Kapp began her career in Los Angeles as a member of The Groundlings comedy troupe. In mid-1990s she began appearing on television shows, including Party of Five, JAG, Seinfeld, Friends, ER and Will & Grace. She also appeared in the television movie A Mother's Prayer (1995) with Linda Hamilton, and from 1998 to 1999 was regular cast member on the short-lived sitcom Maggie Winters.

From 2006 to 2010, Kapp co-starred opposite Julia Louis-Dreyfus in her sitcom The New Adventures of Old Christine on CBS. She also had supporting role in the 2009 comedy film Weather Girl starring Tricia O'Kelley, her The New Adventures of Old Christine co-star. The following years, she guest-starred on Happy Endings, Drop Dead Diva, Two and a Half Men, I Didn't Do It, and Baby Daddy. In 2013, she was cast as female lead in the Fox comedy series Surviving Jack opposite Christopher Meloni, but was fired after one episode. Rachael Harris replaced her in the role.

Personal life
Kapp grew up in New York City, her father a conductor and her mother an opera singer. She graduated from Dartmouth College with a degree in history. Prior to her acting career, Alex Kapp gained notoriety for being Robert Chambers' girlfriend at the time of the 1986 preppie murder scandal. Kapp appears in the documentary The Preppy Murder: Death in Central Park.

Filmography

Film

Television

References

External links

1969 births
Living people
American television actresses
Dartmouth College alumni
Actresses from New York City
20th-century American actresses
21st-century American actresses